Kombiu Rural LLG is a local-level government (LLG) of East New Britain Province, Papua New Guinea.

Wards
01. Baai
02. Nodup
03. Matalau
04. Rakunat
05. Rabuana
06. Korere 1
07. Korere 2
08. Talvat
09. Matupit 1
10. Matupit 2
11. Matupit 3
12. Matupit 4
13. Matupit 5

References

Local-level governments of East New Britain Province